Fiel Dino M. Daa (born February 20, 1984) is a Filipino professional basketball player who last played for the Basilan Steel of the Maharlika Pilipinas Basketball League (MPBL).

The younger brother of Sta. Lucia Realtors' Dennis Daa, he played collegiately for the Letran Knights from 2006 to 2008, and is an undrafted player in the 2009 PBA Draft.  He previously played for Hapee Complete Protectors in the Philippine Basketball League. He also used to play for the Philippine Patriots.

In 2014, with Team Raco/Hofer, Daa won the 13th Araw ng Sibugay Governor's Open tournament.

References

External links
Dino Daa's profile on Letran official website

1984 births
Living people
Basketball players from Leyte (province)
Filipino men's basketball players
Letran Knights basketball players
People from Tacloban
Philippine Patriots players
Shooting guards